Gregory Smith is an American bassist and vocalist.

Works 
He has collaborated with Billy Joel, Wendy O. Williams, Alice Cooper, Blue Öyster Cult, Dokken, Vinnie Moore, Joe Lynn Turner, Ted Nugent, Tommy James & the Shondells, Alan Parsons, The Turtles, Felix Cavaliere, Chuck Negron, Joey Molland, Denny Laine, Glenn Frey, and The Wizards of Winter.

Smith appears in the film Wayne's World as a member of Alice Cooper's band, performing "Feed My Frankenstein".

Rainbow 
In 1993 Smith and Ritchie Blackmore reformed the band Rainbow. Greg remained in the supergroup until 1997.

References

External links
 
 Ted Nugent
 Greg Smith Interview at GuitarVideoChannel.com

20th-century American bass guitarists
20th-century American male musicians
21st-century American bass guitarists
21st-century American male musicians
American male bass guitarists
American rock bass guitarists
Guitarists from New York (state)
Living people
People from Valley Stream, New York
Place of birth missing (living people)
Ted Nugent Band members
Tommy James and the Shondells members
Valley Stream Central High School alumni
Year of birth missing (living people)